Albertus Johannes (Jan) van Gemert (3 June 1921, in Gemert – 11 September 1991, Gemert) was a Dutch painter, graphic artist, sculptor, glass artist and ceramist.

Life 
Jan van Gemert was born in Gemert, the third of twelve children. His father was Marinus van Gemert (1894–1978), an ex-sergeant and worker in the textile industry. His mother, Dora Gruijters (1894–1982), originated from a gardening family. At the age of 13, Jan becomes involved in an accident, and he was missing a leg. Three years later he enrolled in the management program of the Catholic Workers Union in Helmond, where he graduated in 1940.

That same year he fled the Arbeidseinsatz and found refuge in the home of the Dutch painter and ceramic artist Willi Martinali in Deurne. During the war he received drawing lessons from the portraitist Jacques Stroucken. He married Anna Maria van den Broek (1921–1994) in Helmond, with whom he had three children: Petra, Gregor and Theo. After the war he returned to Gemert and had various jobs, including as a house servant, textile worker, clerk and assistant cooks. He also receives assignments together with Willi Martinali to teach courses "Free Expression" to schools and community centers.

In 1952 he builds his own studio with assistance of the mayor of Gemert De Bekker. In 1954 he completed his training at the Design Academy Eindhoven, where he was educated by Jan Gregoor and Jacques van Rijn. He became a member of the General Catholic Artists Association and the Eindhoven club Cultural Contact, which was under the leadership of Jan Henselmans Louis Friday and French Babylon. In 1956 together with Jan Kuhr, Jean Nies and Piet van Hemme he founded the arts center "De Vrije Expressieven," which however would be short-lived. In 1959 he was appointed lecturer at the Secondary Technical School in Eindhoven, and shortly after he joined the Social Academy Eindhoven, where he would teach until 1975. From the mid-seventies, Jan van Gemert had a relation with textile artist Rick Boesewinkel (1931-1993), whom he married a few years before his death.

Work 
In his mostly expressionist work Jan van Gemert is related to, among others Edgar Tijtgat, Herman Kruyder and other "Brabant expressionists" as Hendrik Wiegersma and Jan van Eyck. His favorite medium was oil on hardboard, canvas or paper, but he also used crayons, glue, paint and Siberian chalk. Sculpture, mosaics and reliefs in fire clay and terracotta by Jan van Gemert appeared in Gemert, 's-Hertogenbosch, Uden, Weert, Son (Liberation Monument, see image), Elsendorp (in front of the St. Christopher Church), Made, Drimmelen (Resistance monument), Wanroij, Bakel and Odiliapeel.

His work is in public collections of the Kempenland Museum in Eindhoven. and the Museum De Wieger in Deurne.

See also 
 List of Dutch ceramists

References

Further reading 
 Frans Babylon - 'Jan van Gemert'. In: Schilders van nu in Brabant. Veldhoven, Koningshof: Zusters v.h. Allerh. Hart van Jezus, 1958, 11-12. 
  Fred Backus - Een monografie, maar niet over Jan van Gemert. Budel, De Stichting Keunenhoek, 1981.
 Jan van Gemert - 'Een self-made mens'. In: Harry Verwiel e.a. - Willi Martinali. Denken met twee handen. Deurne, De Wieger, 1988, 23-37. 
 Rob de Haas - 'Route Jan van Gemert'. In: Gemerts Heem, tijdschrift op het gebied van geschiedenis, archeologie, dialect, e.a. van de gemeente Gemert. Jrg. 49, afl. 2 (2007), 29-36.
 P.M.J.E. Jacobs - Beeldend Benelux biografisch handboek. Tilburg, Stichting Studiecentrum voor Beeldende Kunst, 2000.
 Peter Thoben - 'Jan van Gemert'. In: Museumwaaier Museum Kempenland Eindhoven. Eindhoven, Museum Kempenland, 2006, 110-113.
 Jack van der Weide - Kunst vanuit het kippenhok. Over Jan van Gemert. Nijmegen, 2011.

External links 

1921 births
1991 deaths
Dutch ceramists
Dutch sculptors
Dutch male sculptors
20th-century Dutch painters
Dutch male painters
People from Gemert-Bakel
20th-century ceramists
21st-century ceramists
20th-century Dutch male artists